Jessie Ackermann (July 4, 1857 – March 31, 1951) was a social reformer, feminist, journalist, writer and traveller. She was the second round-the-world missionary appointed by the World's Woman's Christian Temperance Union (WWCTU), becoming in 1891 the inaugural president of the federated Australasian Woman's Christian Temperance Union (WCTU), Australia's largest women's reform group. Although an American, Ackermann is considered a major voice in the Australian suffrage movement.

As well as being the author of three books, Ackermann gave talks on travel and temperance around the world and became a skilled and popular speaker with a wide following. She was described as a "speaker of no mean order". In her talks, she advocated equal political, legal and property rights for women.

Ackermann was actively involved in campaigns for women's rights as well as the ongoing international struggle against opium and also tobacco. She became World's superintendent of the WCTU's anti-opium department in 1893–95 and in 1891 established an Anti Narcotics Department of the WCTU in Australia. In 1906 she was made one of the only women fellows of the Royal Scottish Geographical Society.

Life
The daughter of Charles Ackerman(n), and his wife Amanda, née French, Ackermann grew up in Chicago and then moved to California, where in 1880 she studied at the University of California, Berkeley, but did not graduate. In 1881 she began working as a temperance organiser for the Independent Order of Good Templars in California, moving to the Woman's Christian Temperance Union in 1888, "with its special opportunities for work among women". After undertaking a mission to British Columbia and Alaska she was chosen as world missionary at the WCTU national convention in New York City in October 1888. Before the WCTU, Ackermann had served the World Order of Rechabites, whose motto was: "Agitate, educate, legislate and demonstrate". In the 1920s she lived in Johnson City, Tennessee and in the 1930s, mostly at Los Angeles.

WCTU work

International
Ackermann left the United States in January 1889 to begin the first of her world tours. In 1910, she was reported as having completed six world tours and slept in 2,700 beds" but she is generally credited with having circumnavigated the globe eight times. Her travels were recorded by letters to the WCTU publication, The Union Signal and Ladies Home Companion.

Australian

Ackermann arrived at Adelaide in South Australia in 1889, to continue the work started by Mary Leavitt, the WCTU's first world missionary. Described as "vital and charismatic", Ackermann inspired the founding of the WCTU of Western Australia by her visit in 1891 and her administrative efforts revealed considerable organisational skill.  For example, she established an Anti Narcotics Department in 1891. She also held a ten-day temperance mission in Adelaide Town Hall and organised the first Colonial Convention of the WCTU of South Australia, with a membership of 1112 and 23 local unions. The first local Union in Western Australia was formed in York, with another five soon following. By August 1891, a Colonial Union with 155 members had been established. Anna Adams Gordon wrote: "The Round-the-World White Ribbon Missionaries who have since gone out under the banner of the World's WCTU are Miss Jessie Ackermann, of California, who honeycombed Australasia with local Unions, federating them into a National WCTU of their own, of which she became President ..." 
The Woman's Christian Temperance Union of Australasia (later renamed the National Women's Christian Temperance Union of Australia) was formed on the 25th May, 1891 at a meeting held in Melbourne for the purpose of federating the existing Colonial Unions. This was probably the first interstate gathering of women's organisations held in Australia and the Union was the first national women's organization in the country. "At the second national convention of the Australian WCTU in Sydney in 1894, Jessie Ackermann proudly proclaimed, "Our banner floats in forty-seven lands: and in forty-seven languages can we read our motto 'For God and Home and Every Land' ".

Ackermann lectured both in cities and outback towns using lantern slide techniques. So popular and well-known was she in Australia that the state of her health was reported across the country. For example, in 1895 newspapers in Tasmania and in New South Wales reported that she was advised to go to Iceland for her health and that she was recovering her health during a stay with Frances Willard in England.

In Australia, the goal of mid-nineteenth century temperance organisations was to give residents the right to veto licenses to sell alcohol in their towns and suburbs, in contrast to the more ambitious goal of the temperance movement in the United States which was prohibition (the so-called Maine law). The concern of women was to prevent the "ill-usage" they experienced as a result of men drinking. In 1885, 45,000 women in the state of Victoria (almost a quarter of the adult female population) signed a petition asking the government to introduce local option to protect their sex from bad treatment associated with alcohol consumption.

Travels

Few 19th-century women travelled as extensively as Ackermann. It has been pointed out that "she visited so many lands not simply from a spirit of adventure or from curiosity but as a paid organizer, or as her employers called it, a 'round the world missionary' of a large and prominent organization ...", was one of those Victorian women missionaries who "revelled in the travel as much as in the saving of souls". It has been argued that such "reform-minded travel" became in part, a means of demonstrating global awareness and global reach." Although she travelled partly to establish WCT Unions around the world, the journeys were also to undertake work as "a civilizer, feminist, and reporter of the conditions of women and the disadvantaged throughout the world". 
In a conference during her visit to China, for example, all women delegates were made voting members "amid storms of applause" in contrast to the previous meeting thirteen years earlier, when the idea of a woman presenting her work resulted in many "indignant" people leaving the room.
Her first-hand reports of trips through Asia were also a means of raising funds for her temperance campaign.

Ackermann visited countries on the continents of Europe, Asia, Africa and Australasia and she claimed unusually close contact with local people: "I was a guest in nearly two thousand homes, all kinds of homes, rich and poor ...". Beyond the difficulties of her travels to many continents and countries, some of her expeditions involved the kind of extra difficulty that would come to be characterised in later times as "adventure travel". For example, she went camping in 1898 in the Yosemite Valley in America to regain her strength for more travel; she rode horseback through the Australian bush to the Jenolan Caves before going underground to explore them; and she defied convention by going down a coal-mine.

Her reports and involvement were also unusual because of her strong declared interest in the position of women everywhere. She pointed out that only a short time previously, some of her own countrywomen had had to be released from slavery and 'elevated to the dignity of womanhood'. She exhorted American women "to look outward, to take American women's 'higher civilization' to influence women's lives everywhere.". In Philadelphia, USA, she stated that she "had never seen any [philanthropic work] equaling or so large as Sunday Breakfast Association.

Countries and regions Ackermann visited included: Afghanistan via the Khyber Pass and Peshawar; Alaska, to which she was first sent by the WCTU (before it became an American state); Australia, including the states of South Australia, New South Wales, Victoria, Western Australia and Tasmania; (she declared Hobart to be "delightful" having "a complete absence of distinguished persons"); Burma;{China more from "a sense of duty than inclination" on a steamer, which she called a tea boat,; England (London); Europe; Iceland, between 1894 and 1897 where she founded a WCTU; India, where she noted the devotion of the Hindus and toured the Taj Mahal; Japan, including Hokkaido as well as Sakhalin and the Kuril Islands not long after the First Sino-Japanese War in 1894–95 (In 1906, she published an article in the Scottish Geographical Society about her visit to the Ainu people in which she expressed her concern about the tattooing done on the women, comparing it with the foot binding in China and noting that the Ainu women "share the fate of all the women of the East" by being far from equal with the men in spite of the fact that they did all the heavy work.'Of course, the men cheerfully aid by free advice and directions' she added ironically"); Java, where a journey to a temple was two hundred miles by slow rail; Kashmir; New Zealand, a place she said she would have chosen to live other than America; Siam, a place that was very difficult to reach at that time; the Sandwich Islands, where the Japanese Consul-General acted as her interpreter; Singapore, where she noted that "thirty different languages are spoken"; South Africa, en route to which, she climbed the mast in a divided skirt alongside the captain and another man.

Writing
Ackermann's writings are said to "reveal a woman of wide interests who belongs in the company of nineteenth-century 'lady explorers'." Her three published books are:

 Ackermann, Jessie, The World through a Woman's Eyes (1896) Chicago
 Ackermann, Jessie, What Women Have Done with the Vote (1913) New York, W.B. Feakins
 Ackermann, Jessie, Australia from a woman's point of view (1913) Cassell & Co Ltd London, New York, Toronto, Melbourne

Recognition
In 1962 Ackermann was honoured by being made a memorial member of the World's WCTU. When working as the American Union's second world missionary, Ackermann particularly ensured that women's suffrage was high on the agenda and in the late twentieth century her contribution was acknowledged.

References

Sources
 Jessie A. Ackermann Archives  East Tennessee State University
 Blocker, Jack S., David M. Fahey, Ian R. Tyrrell (2003) Alcohol and Temperance in Modern History: An International Encyclopedia, Volume 1 ABC-CLIO.
 Carr, Margaret Shipley (2009) The Temperance Worker as Social Reformer and Ethnographer as Exemplified in the Life and Work of Jessie A. Ackermann Master of Arts in Liberal Studies (MALS) East Tennessee State University Archives of Appalachia
 Gordon, Anna A. (c1898) The Beautiful Life of Frances E. Willard, Woman's Temperance Publishing Association, Chicago
 Grimshaw, Patricia (2004) "Settler anxieties, indigenous peoples and women's suffrage in the colonies of Australia, New Zealand and Hawai'i, 1888–1902" in Women's Suffrage in Asia: Gender, Nationalism and Democracy Louise P. Edwards, Mina Roces, Psychology Press, August 25, 2004
 Harman, Kaye (1985) (ed.) Australia brought to book: responses to Australia by visiting writers, 1836–1939 Boobook Publications, 	Balgowlah, NSW 
 Lees, Kirsten (1995) Votes for women: the Australian story, Allen & Unwin, St. Leonards, NSW  
 Oldfield, Audrey (1992)Woman Suffrage in Australia: a gift or a struggle? Cambridge University Press, Cambridge [England] Melbourne 
 Tyrrell, Ian (1983) "International Aspects of the Woman’s Temperance Movement in Australia: The Influence of the American WCTU, 1882–1914" in Journal of Religious History Volume 12, Issue 3, pages 284–304, June 1983
 Tyrrell, Ian (1991) Woman's World Woman's Empire, Chapel Hill: University of North Carolina Press, 
 Tyrrell, Ian (1999) Deadly Enemies: Tobacco and Its Opponents in Australia, UNSW Press, 1999 
 Tyrrell, Ian (2005) Ackermann, Jessie A. (1857–1951), Australian Dictionary of Biography, National Centre of Biography, Australian National University, accessed May 4, 2012
 Tyrrell, Ian (2010) Reforming the world: the creation of America's moral empire, Princeton University Press, Princeton, N.J.

External links

 WCTU medal (c.1890) in Museum Victoria
 
 National Woman's Christian Temperance Union of Australia at The Encyclopedia of Women and Leadership in Twentieth-Century Australia

1857 births
1951 deaths
Writers from Chicago
American expatriates in Australia
American suffragists
American temperance activists
Australian temperance activists
Writers from California
Woman's Christian Temperance Union people
American feminists
Activists from California
People from Frankfort, Illinois
19th-century American women politicians
19th-century American politicians
American Protestant missionaries
Female Christian missionaries
Wikipedia articles incorporating text from A Woman of the Century